Baron Miklós Tassilo Csillaghy de Pacsér von Fürstenberg  (born 1992) is an Italian equestrian who has competed for Italy and Austria.

Early life and family 
Csillaghy is the eldest child of Virginia von Fürstenberg and Alexandre Csillaghy de Pacsér. His mother is a member of the Swabian Princely family of Fürstenberg and his father is a member of a Hungarian noble family. He descends maternally from the Agnelli family. Clara Agnelli was his great-grandmother. He is a grandnephew of actress Princess Ira von Fürstenberg and fashion designer Prince Egon von Fürstenberg, the ex-husband of Diane von Fürstenberg. He is the older brother of Ginevra Csillaghy de Pacsér von Fürstenberg.

Career 
Csillaghy trained under Italian Olympic equestrian Vincenzo Chimirri and competed for Italy as a pony rider in multiple Nations Cup competitions. He placed sixteenth in 2007 at the European Pony Championships in Freudenberg, Germany. He competed again in 2008 in Avenches, France. He won silver and gold medals at the Italian Pony Championships and a silver medal as a junior competitor. In 2010 he competed for Austria, winning a bronze medal, at the Nations Cup in Hagen, Germany. He competed again for Austria in Jardy, France at the 2010 European Championships.

References 

Living people
Agnelli family
1992 births
Barons of Austria
Fürstenberg (princely family)
Csillaghy family
Italian male equestrians
Italian people of German descent
Italian people of Hungarian descent
Hungarian nobility